, also stylized as ∀ Gundam, is a 1999 Japanese mecha anime series produced by Sunrise, and aired between 1999 and 2000 on Japan's FNN networks. It was created for the Gundam Big Bang 20th Anniversary celebration, and is the eighth installment in the Gundam franchise. It was later compiled in 2002 into two feature-length films entitled Turn A Gundam I: Earth Light and Turn A Gundam II: Moonlight Butterfly.

Turn A Gundam was directed by Yoshiyuki Tomino, who is the main creator of the Gundam franchise, and who had written and directed many previous Gundam works. Tomino created the series as a means of "affirmatively accepting all of the Gundam series", which is reflected in the series title's use of the Turned A, a mathematical symbol representing universal quantification.

Overview
Turn A Gundam takes place in the year , in a different calendar era than the previous Gundam projects. The Japanese term for Correct Century, Seireki, is a wordplay on the Japanese term for the Common Era (CE) Western calendar system (pronounced Seireki). The population of the Earth is, at the beginning of the series, limited to simple, steam-driven technology after past cataclysms; the Moon is populated by the Moonrace, humans who left Earth after a great war long ago to reside in technologically advanced lunar colonies until such time as they deemed the Earth suitable to return to.

Plot

Turn A Gundam follows the character Loran Cehack, a young member of the Moonrace. Selected as part of a reconnaissance mission to determine whether the Earth was fit for resettlement, Loran lands on the continent of North America, spends two years living on Earth as the chauffeur to the Heim family, and grows attached to its people. With the expectation of a peaceful resettlement operation from his people, he and a pair of his close friends sent down with him confirm that the Earth is now fit for the Moonrace to make their return. He's taken by surprise when the Moonrace intends to return to Earth via an offensive with mobile suits, and their first attack sparks a violent conflict between Earth and moon.

The night of the first attack, Loran is at the White Doll, an enormous humanoid statue, for a coming-of-age ceremony. When the Moonrace attacks and the battle in town can be seen from a distance the children panic. In the midst of this panic, the White Doll shatters, revealing a metallic figure within, and the shrine collapses around it. During the panic, Loran recognizes the White Doll as a mobile suit, and succeeds in applying his knowledge of the Moonrace's mobile suits to pilot it. The death of the Heim patriarch in the attack pulls the family and Loran into the budding war; Loran becomes the designated pilot of the White Doll, and its discovery prompts the excavation of further mobile suits in the various "mountain cycles" covering the Earth. As the Moonrace's invasion rapidly turns into a full-fledged war against the increasingly armed Earthrace, it becomes clear that this state of affairs is divisive among both groups; while the Moonrace's queen Dianna Soreil attempts to negotiate with the local leaders for a peaceful solution by which the Moonrace can come to reside on the Earth, the militaristic among both populations interfere with the negotiations again and again, forcing the war to continue as opposed to accepting a compromise.

Media

Anime

The series aired 50 episodes in Japan from April 9, 1999 to April 14, 2000 on Fuji TV, being the only Gundam anime to air on said channel. It was directed by Yoshiyuki Tomino and produced by Hideyuki Tomioka, Takayuki Yoshii, and Yoshihiro Suzuki. Character designs was by Akira Yasuda and Yoshihito Hishinuma while mecha designs were done by Atsushi Shigeta, Kunio Okawara, Syd Mead, Takumi Sakura. Shigemi Ikeda directed the art and Yota Tsuruoka directed the sound. Toshiaki Ohta and Yoko Kanno composed the music.

The eponymous Turn A Gundam is notable because it is the first Gundam mecha designed entirely by a foreigner, the famous American visual futurist and conceptual artist Syd Mead. The first design of the new Gundam created by Mead was rejected at first by Yoshiyuki due to its extremely exotic appearance, since Tomino decided that he wanted a figure closer to previous Gundam designs. Because of its quality and impressive appearance, the old design was not discarded at all by Tomino, instead renamed and used by him as the antagonist mobile suit design Sumo.

Mead designed the Turn A Gundam using real world industrial design aspects, which were aimed to make it look simple and realistic. The shield was one of the components designed by Syd Mead with little constraint from the production team. It needed to be big enough so that the suit could hide behind it, making it easier for the anime production staff to draw. Syd Mead imagined it to be like a clam shell and finally settled with a design that looked like the old MS-14 Gelgoog's shield from the first series.

Turn A Gundam is the last entry of the Gundam franchise (not counting the compilations and future video game cut scenes) to be mostly hand painted on cels. Mobile Suit Gundam SEED, released in 2002, was the first series to switch entirely to digital ink and paint.

The series had two films releases, Turn A Gundam I: Earth Light released February 9, 2002 and Turn A Gundam II: Moonlight Butterfly released February 10, 2002. The films were a condensed retelling of the 50 episodes between the two.

Manga
The Series had two manga adaptations. One by Kōichi Tokita published by Kodansha Ltd. running from April 15, 1999 to March 15, 2000 through Comic BomBom Magazine. Another written by Yoshiyuki Tomino running from June 26, 1999 to March, 2002 that was published by Kodansha Ltd. In their magazine, Monthly Magazine Z.

There would be a manga release that would serve as a prequel for the main series titled, Turn A Gundam: Tsuki no Kaze written by Akira Yasuda that would be published by Kadokawa Shoten in their magazine, Gundam Ace running from March 2004 to March 2005. The manga would follow a younger Loran prior to the events of the main show or manga. Here it is shown the process that Loran and the other characters training to for the upcoming reconnaissance mission on earth. As well as introduce how Loran would eventually be selected for the mission, and send off to earth.

Relationship with other Gundam series
Turn A Gundam has been cited by Director Tomino and other sources as a show that would unify the stories from the various Gundam series into one. Throughout the show, mobile suits resembling those from the eras depicted in previous Gundam shows and indicated to be preserved by nano machines for thousands of years, including as those of the Universal Century, are excavated by the show's various factions.

The book 2001 Correct Century, A Bibliographical Study of "Dark History", printed in black pages in front of the Universal Century Gundam Officials Encyclopedia, is supposedly uncovered by a fictional Lecturer in Black History named Yokk Wakk Onimott during Correct Century 1993. Onimott spends two years to fix the broken pages, five years to interpret the language, and a year to find a publisher. He states that the book was first printed around 3,000 years ago by the Rhea branch of the Earth Federation Government University. Included in the book is a picture drawn by Kunio Okawara showing a mobile suit supposed to be MS-04 as a S.U.I.T. project of the Zeon forces in UC0072~0075. It supposedly was found in 1993 Correct Century in the mountain cycle Library A-a. The white page introduction by another fictional writer, Minaka Junkers, an economy assistant professor of the Rhea branch of the Earth Federation Government University, states the book was published in UC0100 to celebrate the Centennial anniversary of the Universal Century. Thus it is officially claimed that the Universal Century is a time before Correct Century, possibly around 3,000 years before the story of Turn A begins.

Later sources would greatly increase the time frame between the two.  The official English Gundam.info Archives website, created by Sunrise, describes Correct Century as, "similar to early 20th Century America, but is actually set tens of thousands of years in the distant future and incorporates every Universal Century and Another Gundam timeline that ever existed."  The manual for the Master Grade Turn X gunpla, released in June 2014, would further attempt to expand what is covered by the Dark History as the original Mobile Suit Gundam marking the beginning of humanity's space age, and Turn A as the final result, with all other Gundam series, including those that were produced prior to Turn A: G Gundam, Gundam Wing, and Gundam X, and those produced after: Gundam SEED, Gundam 00, and Gundam AGE, taking place in the tens of thousands of years in between the two shows.  However, due to the Irreconcilable setting conflicts caused by attempting to include more series into a unified backstory than was originally included at the time of Turn A's make, the idea of setting alternate timeline Gundam Series—Especially ones produced after Turn A was—in the same universe as Turn A itself has come to be a concept that is largely dismissed and disregarded due to the needless complications and retcons that then engenders to material that was never intended to originally be part of such.

Music
Openings:
 by Hideki Saijo (Ep. 2-38)
"Century Color" by RAY-GUNS (Ep. 39 - 50)

Endings:
"Aura" by Shinji Tanimura (Ep. 1 - 40)
 by Yoko Kanno (sung by Aki Okui) (Ep. 41–49)
 by Aki Okui (Ep. 50)
"After All" by Donna Burke (First compilation film ending)
"Tsuki no Mayu" (Moon's Cocoon) by Yoko Kanno (sung by Aki Okui) (Second compilation film ending ~ In its full version right before the ending credits which are instrumental only)

Inserts:
"Moon" by Gabriela Robin (a.k.a. Yoko Kanno)
 by White Doll no Matsuri no Kaiichidou
 by Hideki Saijo
 by RRET Team
"Black History" by Kaoru Nishino

North American release
On 22 July 2010, Bandai Entertainment announced that they had acquired the license to release Turn A Gundam in the United States and that they were planning to release the series on Region 1 DVD in 2011. The release was cancelled in January 2012 when Bandai Entertainment announced it would no longer offer any new products in the North American territory.

On October 11, 2014 at their 2014 New York Comic-Con panel, Sunrise announced they will be releasing all of the Gundam franchise, including Turn A Gundam in North America though distribution from Right Stuf Inc., beginning in Spring 2015.

On March 11, 2015, Right Stuf Inc. announced that the first 25 episodes will be released on June 30, 2015. Sunrise and Right Stuf will also release the Turn A Gundam films in addition to the TV series.

On April 3, 2015, Right Stuf Inc. announced the remaining 25 episodes of the show would be released on August 4, 2015 via Blu-ray release.

Reception

Mobile Suit Gundam 00 designer Yun Kōga cited Turn A when asked about her favorite series within the franchise.

The Turn A Gundam was chosen to be the 100th Master Grade model of Gunpla (abbreviation of Gundam Plastic Model) and at an earlier time, the first release of the Turn A Gundam DVD box set was announced.  Two of the three Model Magazine in Japan, Hobby Japan and Dengeki Hobby was informed to build their own Turn A model using the old 1/100 kit for a display in the official announcement of the MS100 Turn A.  Hobby Japan modeller Seira Masuo drastically redesigned the unit while Dengeki Hobby modeller went for the original approach of diorama.  Both of the models was placed next to the MG100 draft design at the Bandai display forum at the announcement of MG100. Tomino addressed his little disappointment in the design of Turn A Gundam not having good reception, but he commented that it was happy to see that it was not pointless work as Turn A was selected as the 100th Master Grade model.

Turn A Gundam is also available on High Grade 1/144 scale and on Robot Spirit line. Turn X was released in Master Grade format in June 2014.

References

External links
 Official Website 
 

 
1999 anime television series debuts
1999 manga
2002 anime films
Japanese animated films
2004 manga
Fuji TV original programming
Gundam anime and manga
Kadokawa Shoten manga
Kodansha manga
Kōichi Tokita
Post-apocalyptic anime and manga
Shōnen manga
Sunrise (company)